This is a list of the best-selling albums in China.

As of 2021, China was the world's 6th largest music market, an increase from being 14th in 2015 and 27th in 2005.

Best-selling albums in China 
This is a list of Top 10 Best Selling Albums in China.

Best-selling physical albums 
The following is a list of the best-selling physical albums in China, with album sales of over 500,000 units.

List of best-selling digital albums (5 tracks or more)

2 million or more units

1 million or more units

List of best-selling digital singles/EPs (4 tracks or less)

20 million or more units

10 million or more units

5 million or more units

3 million or more units

See also
 Music of China
 Mandopop
 List of best-selling albums
 List of best-selling albums by country

Notes

References

China
Chinese music